Anthony Chigaemezu Uzodimma (born 17 April 1999) is a Nigerian footballer who plays as a midfielder for Turkish club Kayserispor.

Professional career
On 23 August 2019, Uzodimma signed a professional contract with Kayserispor. Uzodimma made his professional debut with Kayserispor in a 2–0 Turkish Cup loss to Fenerbahçe on 21 January 2020.

References

External links
 
 

1999 births
Living people
Nigerian footballers
Association football midfielders
Kayserispor footballers
Giresunspor footballers
Ankara Keçiörengücü S.K. footballers
Süper Lig players
TFF First League players
Nigerian expatriate footballers
Expatriate footballers in Turkey
Nigerian expatriate sportspeople in Turkey